Rotherfield and Mark Cross (also Rotherfield) is the name of a closed station on the Eridge - Heathfield - Polegate railway (the Cuckoo Line) in East Sussex. The station was built by London, Brighton and South Coast Railway and closed with the line in 1965 (the "Beeching Axe").

The station building is still standing, and is in use as a private house.

References

External links 
 Disused station site

Disused railway stations in East Sussex
Former London, Brighton and South Coast Railway stations
Railway stations in Great Britain closed in 1965
Railway stations in Great Britain opened in 1880
Beeching closures in England
Thomas Myres buildings
1880 establishments in England
1965 disestablishments in England
Mark Cross railway station